Andrew Tang (born 13 November 1994) is a Singaporean racing driver.

Career

Andrew Tang joined Team McLaren's Young Driver Programme in July 2012. Driving for Neale Motorsport, he became the champion of the 2014 Toyota Racing Series held in New Zealand. 

In 2014 Tang attempted to defer his National service in Singapore in order to keep on racing but his deferment was denied and served his National Service.

After finishing his National Service, Tang joined the Porsche China Junior team after becoming the top racer in the Porsche China Junior Programme in December 2015.  He also won a sponsorship to race in Class A of the Porsche Carrera Cup Asia (PCCA). Tang won his first PCCA race in the fifth round at the Japan circuit.

In 2016, his contract with Porsche China Junior team was extended for another year and will represent PCCA in the Porsche Motorsport Junior Programme shootout.

References

External links
 
 

1994 births
Living people
Singaporean people of Chinese descent
Singaporean racing drivers
Karting World Championship drivers
Toyota Racing Series drivers
Formula Renault 2.0 NEC drivers
Formula Renault 2.0 Alps drivers
Prema Powerteam drivers
Jenzer Motorsport drivers